The Maharashtra State Board of Technical Education (MSBTE) is an autonomous board of education in the state of Maharashtra, India. It designs and implements diploma, post diploma and advanced diploma programs to affiliated institutions. The board was established in 1963 to cater the increasing needs of affiliated institutions and their students.

History
The establishment of a separate board responsible for higher education dates back to 1963. Before the country's independence for British Raj, diploma courses in Engineering and Technology were provided institutions like the College of Engineering, Pune, Veermata Jijabai Technological Institute, Mumbai, Cusrow Wadia Institute of Technology, Pune and Government Polytechnic, Nagpur. A Directorate of Technical Education was set up in 1948 to control technical education in all levels. As industrial development increased, the demand for diploma courses also did, and the government established a separate Board of Technical Examinations in August 1963. It was later renamed to Maharashtra State Board of Technical Education and given an autonomous status in 1999.

MSBTE conduct Summer and Winter Exams every six months. The Summer exams are held during April/May Month and Winter exams are held during November/December month.

Affiliated Institutes
All polytechnic institutes in the maharashtra are affiliated to MSBTE, out of which 43 are Government Polytechnic institutes.
A total of 26 institutes are affiliated to the board.
Government Polytechnic, Ramwadi, Pen
Government Polytechnic, Mumbai
M.H. Saboo Siddik, Byculla, Mumbai
Vidyalankar Polytechnic, Wadala, Mumbai
Shah and Anchor Kutchhi Polytechnic, Chembur, Mumbai 
V.E.S. Polytechnic, Chembur, Mumbai
Government Polytechnic, Pune
 Anand Charitable Sanstha's Diploma in Engineering & Technology Ashti
Government Polytechnic, Awasari Kh
Vidya Prasarak Mandals Polytechnic, Thane
Cusrow Wadia Institute of Technology, Pune
Walchand College of Engineering, Sangli
Government Polytechnic, Karad
Government Polytechnic, Kolhapur
Institute of Civil and Rural Engineering, Gargoti 
Government Polytechnic, Ratnagiri
Government Polytechnic, Solapur
P.L. Government Polytechnic, Latur
Shikshan Maharshi Dadasaheb Rawal Government Polytechnic, Dhule
Government Polytechnic, Jalgaon
Government Polytechnic, Aurangabad
Government Polytechnic, Nanded
Government Polytechnic, Khamgaon. 
St John college of engineering and technology palghar
SSVPS College of Engineering and Polytechnic, Dhule
Mandar Education Society, Maharashtra
Sandip Polytechnic, Nashik
VIVA College of Diploma Engg. & Tech., Virar
Shree Shankar Narayan Education Trust, Pravin Patil College of Diploma Engg. & Technology, Bhayinder (E) Western Rly

Important Links 
 MSBTE official website
 List of Government Polytechnic Colleges in Maharashtra
 MSBTE Study resources

References

Education in Maharashtra
Career and technical education